Gagnoa is a city in south-central Ivory Coast. It is the seat of both Gôh-Djiboua District and Gôh Region. It is also the seat of and a sub-prefecture of Gagnoa Department. Gagnoa is also a commune. In the 2014 census, the city had a population of 160,465, making it the seventh-largest city in the country.

Gagnoa is the seat of the Roman Catholic Archdiocese of Gagnoa, and contains its cathedral.

Notable people
French rapper Vegedream's father as well as fellow performer and uncle Ziké are from Gagnoa, and Vegedream, famously the artist in the song Ramenez la coupe à la maison, says the French phrase Et ça c'est Vegedream de Gagnoa, meaning "And that is Vegedream of Gagnoa", in each song. He got that phrase when he visited Gagnoa as a child. He is therefore also named Vegedream de Gagnoa.

Climate
Gagnoa has a tropical savanna climate (Köppen Aw) with a lengthy although not particularly intense wet season from February/March to November, and a short dry season centred upon December and January.

References

 
Sub-prefectures of Gôh
District capitals of Ivory Coast
Communes of Gôh
Regional capitals of Ivory Coast